Colonel Edward "Ed" Straker, USAF, Commander-in-chief of SHADO is the main character of British TV series UFO. He is one of the original promoters of Project Angel, an international organization to found the Supreme Headquarters Alien Defense Organisation (SHADO), in order to fight incoming flying saucers carrying hostile aliens. He is always portrayed by actor Ed Bishop.

Fictional biography
Information has been taken from the UFO episodes which establish a timeline of Straker's life, cited in parenthesis.

Nothing is known of Ed Straker's youth, but it is known that he became a United States Air Force pilot and a Colonel and became friends with Royal Air Force pilot Alec E. Freeman. He later met General James L. Henderson, who, as the episodes "Identified" and "Confetti Check A-OK!" suggest, introduced him, in the early 1970s, in Project Angel (a project to fight incoming hostile UFOs), in which the United States, the Soviet Union, France and an unidentified side of Germany cooperated. As the United States were the major contributor to the project, the leader of the defense organization was to be an American, and Straker suggested ("Confetti Check A-OK!") he to be his friend General Henderson, but he could not cover this role as he was severely injured in a UFO attack to the Rolls-Royce Phantom V in which he, Straker and "the Cabinet Minister" were traveling to meet the Prime minister of the United Kingdom ("Identified"). In the same period, he married ("Confetti Check A-OK!") a woman named "Mary". Due to work to put in action Project Angel, Straker stayed much time out of home, and Mary's mother started thinking ("Confetti Check A-OK!") that he was cheating her daughter, then she hired a detective and, Straker, knowing that he was being followed, started to organize Project Angel meetings at the house of female employee Ayshea Johnson to protect military secrets by making his absence appear as a love story with her. After knowing of this, a pregnant Mary divorced from Straker, but had ("Confetti Check A-OK!") a premature birth due to shock. Their son was named "John", and Mary married a man named "Rutland" (as seen in "A Question of Priorities").

Approximately ten years later, SHADO (the Supreme Headquarters Alien Defence Organisation) became fully operational, with Straker as Commander-in-chief and Col. Freeman as Second-in-command, and its headquarters thirty meters under the Harlington-Straker Studios in Harlington (with many SHADO members also working inside it). It is known that shortly after this, a special radar device designed by Col. Virginia Lake was transported ("Identified") on a supersonic Seagull X-ray airplane, under Freeman's supervision, but the aircraft was attacked by a UFO. Luckily, the saucer was destroyed by SHADO's Sky One aircraft, piloted by Capt. Peter Carlin.

Some time later, SHADO went in contact ("Exposed") with three incoming UFOs, which flew by the Moon and were detected by SHADO Moonbase, but one of them was not intercepted by its fightercraft. Sky One was launched to destroy it, but, in the same area, Paul J. Foster was testing a high-speed airplane, Ventura Aircraft Corporation's XV-104. The UFO approached it and he and his copilot, Jim, took some photographs and a video, but the aircraft was badly damaged when Sky One fired a missile at the saucer. Jim died and Foster suffered minor injuries, before being fired by Ventura's leader, Mr. Kofax. After some investigation, Foster became aware of SHADO's existence, and became SHADO recruit 804 and a director at Harlington-Straker. Foster soon became close friends with Freeman, but Straker kept a strictly formal relationship with him, and later transferred him to the Moonbase.

In that period, John was hit ("A Question of Priorities") by a Ferrari 275 GTB while walking on a road, and was transported to an hospital, but, due to an allergy to antibiotics, he required a special product from the United States. Straker ordered a SHADAIR airplane to transport it from New York City to Harlington, but acting Commander-in-chief Freeman, unaware of the fact, ordered the plane to stop in Ireland before doing this, trying to intercept an alien defector. The plane, however, arrived too late, and John died, then Mary decided to not meet Straker anymore.

UFO (TV series)
Fictional astronauts
Fictional United States Air Force personnel